Miracle Milly (born December 2011) is the world's smallest dog by height, according to the Guinness Book of World Records.

She was born in December 2011, and weighs approximately 1 pound (half a kilogram). On 21 February 2013 her height was measured, placing her at 9.65 cm (3.8 in). The previous smallest dog was Boo Boo, at 4 inches (10.16 centimeters) tall. Miracle Milly is owned by  Vanesa Semler from Dorado, Puerto Rico.

The pet cloning company Sooam has announced that they have produced 49 clones of Milly.

References

External links
 Official site.
And The Breed Is Normal Chihuahua Need Proof: https://www.google.com/search?q=milly+dog+breed&rlz=1C1CHBF_enUS881US881&oq=mill&aqs=chrome.0.69i59j69i57j69i60l2j69i61.1479j0j7&sourceid=chrome&ie=UTF-8

2011 animal births
Individual dogs